Henry Fitzhugh (August 7, 1801 "The Hive", Washington County, Maryland – August 11, 1866) was an American merchant, businessman and politician from New York.

Life
He was the son of Col. William Fitzhugh, Jr. (1761–1839, one of the founders of Rochester, New York) and Ann (Hughes) Fitzhugh (1771–1829). Baptised and raised in Saint John's Parish, Henry  removed with the Fitzhugh family at the age of 15 to a tract of the Phelps and Gorham Purchase in 1816. On December 11, 1827, Henry married Elizabeth Barbara Carroll (1806–1866, sister of Charles H. Carroll) at Groveland, New York.

He was a member of the New York State Assembly (Oswego Co.) in 1849. He was a Canal Commissioner from 1852 to 1857, elected on the Whig ticket in the New York state election, 1851 and New York state election, 1854.

He was buried at the Williamsburg Cemetery in Groveland, NY.

U.S. presidential candidates James G. Birney and Gerrit Smith, and State Senator Frederick F. Backus (1794–1858), were his brothers-in-law.

Sources
Official State Canvass, in NYT on January 1, 1852
The Charges against Henry Fitzhugh, in NYT on April 4, 1853
Whig Convention, in NYT on September 21, 1854, nominating Fitzhugh for re-election
The New York Civil List compiled by Franklin Benjamin Hough (pages 42, 237 and 273; Weed, Parsons and Co., 1858)
Fitzhugh genealogy in Upstate Arcadia: Landscape, Aesthetics, and the Triumph of Social Differentiation in America by Peter J. Hugill (Rowman & Littlefield, 1995,  ; page 50)
 Political Graveyard
 Transcriptions from Gravestones, at RootsWeb
 Fitzhugh genealogy

1801 births
1866 deaths
People from Groveland, New York
Erie Canal Commissioners
Members of the New York State Assembly
People from Washington County, Maryland
New York (state) Whigs
19th-century American politicians
Carroll family